The Man Who Loved Women is a 1983 American comedy film directed by Blake Edwards and starring Burt Reynolds, Julie Andrews and Kim Basinger. It is a remake of the 1977 François Truffaut's film L'Homme qui aimait les femmes.

It chronicles the affairs of an artist, as told from the perspective of his analyst and eventual lover. She chronicles his obsessive love of women, which leads to his eventual death.

Plot synopsis
David Fowler (Reynolds) is a successful sculptor whose fast and loose lovelife slams him head-on into a mid-life crisis when his insatiable hunger for women begins to render him socially, artistically, and sexually impotent. His quest to end his losing streak leads him to the couch of attractive psychiatrist Marianna (Andrews), to whom David must explain everything—beginning with his first sexual encounter—in an attempt to regain control of his life.

David relates his exploits, including an affair with Louise, a beautiful woman married to a Texas millionaire, who likes to have sex in risky public places. He also has a fling with Agnes, mistaking her for a woman he saw on the street whose legs were all of her that he could view.

David ultimately falls in love with Marianna, his therapist, who must cease seeing him as a patient to indulge their affair. His funeral draws women of all kinds, lining up to pay their last respects.

Cast
 Burt Reynolds - David Fowler
 Julie Andrews - Marianna
 Kim Basinger - Louise Carr
 Marilu Henner - Agnes Chapman
 Cynthia Sikes - Courtney Wade
 Jennifer Edwards - Nancy
 Sela Ward - Janet Wainwright
 Ellen Bauer - Svetlana
 Denise Crosby - Enid
 Tracy Vaccaro - Legs
 Barry Corbin - Roy Carr
 Roger Rose - Sergeant Stone

Production
In September 1982, Blake Edwards announced he would make the film with Warren Beatty. Dustin Hoffman had reportedly turned down the lead role.

Eventually Beatty dropped out. In December 1982, Burt Reynolds signed to star.

Edwards wrote the script with Milton Wexler, his therapist. Wexler had analysed Edwards' scripts for years, especially "10" (1979). "I said if we could come up with something good and startling we'd do one together," said Edwards.

There were a number of American remakes of French films at the time, others including Buddy, Buddy, The Toy, Breathless and Blame It On Rio.

Filming started in March 1983.

A scene was improvised between Reynolds and Julie Andrews, playing Reynolds' therapist. Unbeknownst to Reynolds, Andrews wore an earpiece and received advice from Wexler as she asked questions to Reynolds.

"Burt came to me and asked me if it was valid for this character to want children," said Edwards. "I said it was. Burt said he had been longing to have a family. We set up three cameras and asked Burt why he wanted to have children. He said he had been thinking about adopting a child. And that led to the scene. It was fascinating. Burt shifts in and out of the character several times." But it was not used because "It's too real. It almost makes you uncomfortable. It's so emotional, so poignant."

New Ending
Columbia, who financed the film, were dissatisfied with the film's ending, wondering it might be too bleak. They requested Edwards consider shooting a new one. Edwards had endured painful experiences with Hollywood studios in the past—he immortalised them in his film S.O.B.—but because the relationship with Columbia had been good, he agreed. "Burt was against it and technically I didn't have to but it had been a good experience up until then and I wanted to be co-operative."
Five months after filming ended and one month before it was to be released, Edwards reshot the ending. The scene did not involve Reynolds, but some of his conquests, including those played by Julie Andrews, Marilu Henner and Kim Basinger. This was done to make the film less bleak. The extra scene was shot over two days.

The new ending was screen tested and reports were positive. However the two different endings were both screened on December 3 in some "controlled research screenings" and the original ending was strongly preferred. Columbia decided to release the original ending. "Trying to read the research is not always an exact science," said Columbia's then head of production, Guy McElwaine.

Reception 
In the United States, the film opened at #10 and went on to gross $10,964,231.

Roger Ebert gave the film two stars out of four and called it "a sad movie with a funny movie inside trying to get out." Vincent Canby of The New York Times wrote, "It takes an inordinate amount of time to build up momentum, but once it does, 'The Man Who Loved Women.' Blake Edwards' 'Americanization' of François Truffaut's 1977 French comedy, skates successfully over thin ice." Variety wrote, "'The Man Who Loved Women' may do for Burt Reynolds' girl-chases films about what 'Stroker Ace' did for his car-chase films, that is to say, not much. 'Women' is truly woeful, reeking of production-line, big star filmmaking and nothing else ... there's an unpleasant feeling for about an hour that this film is never going to get started, followed for another 50 minutes by the equally unpleasant feeling that it may never end." Gene Siskel of the Chicago Tribune gave the film three stars out of four and wrote that "Edwards' script doesn't seem to be able to make up its mind whether it wants to be serious or not. But after the film's comic high point—a funny scene involving the Texas oilman, his wife, their little dog, two piece of carpet and a tube of Crazy Glue—'The Man Who Loved Women' settles down and views David at a clinical distance with a strangely affecting compassion." Kevin Thomas of the Los Angeles Times wrote that Reynolds "is stuck having to play a character so totally self-absorbed that it's impossible to care about him. As a result, what was minor but admirable in the Truffaut work has been transformed by Edwards and his co-writers Milton Wexler and Geoffrey Edwards into a major bore." Gary Arnold of The Washington Post wrote, "Derived from one of François Truffaut's least satisfying movies, the Blake Edwards remake of 'The Man Who Loved Women,' now at area theaters, always loomed as some kind of fiasco. The only surprise is that Edwards and his hapless associates, particularly costars Burt Reynolds and Julie Andrews, have adapted the prototype with such suicidal fidelity."

On review aggregator Rotten Tomatoes, the film has an approval rating of 33% based on 12 reviews, with an average score of 5.10/10.

Follow up
Edwards and Reynolds enjoyed working together and initially planned to do a remake of the Laurel and Hardy short The Music Box with Richard Pryor. Pryor backed out and instead Edwards and Reynolds teamed on City Heat (1984), although Edwards would leave the project.

References

External links 
 The Man Who Loved Women on Sony Pictures Entertainment
 
 
 The Man Who Loved Women from Rotten Tomatoes

1983 films
American sex comedy films
1980s romantic comedy-drama films
American romantic comedy-drama films
Columbia Pictures films
Films directed by Blake Edwards
Films shot in Houston
American remakes of French films
Films scored by Henry Mancini
1980s sex comedy films
Films with screenplays by Blake Edwards
1983 comedy films
1983 drama films
1980s English-language films
1980s American films